Thomas Regnaudin (baptised 18 February 1622 – 3 July 1706) was a French sculptor, affiliated with Northern Baroque. Some of Regnaudin's works were placed in the Apollo Gallery of the Louvre. A son of a stonemason, he was a pupil of Anguier.

Notes

External links
Entry in Art Encyclopedia

17th-century French sculptors
French male sculptors
1622 births
1706 deaths